The 1998 Brisbane Broncos season was the eleventh in the history of Brisbane's National Rugby League premiership team, the Brisbane Broncos. Coached by Wayne Bennett and captained by Allan Langer, they participated in the newly formed National Rugby League's 1998 premiership and posted their three biggest ever wins in rounds 5, 7 and 15 before finishing the regular season as minor premiers. The Broncos then won the 1998 NRL Grand Final, capturing their fourth premiership in seven seasons.

Season summary 
For the 1998 season the Broncos were joined by future Melbourne Storm coach, Craig Bellamy who would work under head coach Wayne Bennett as performance co-ordinator and assistant coach.

As could be expected by their finish to the 1997 season, Brisbane were solid in their first five matches of 1998, snatching five victories. In rounds five and seven, the Broncos won by a margin of 54 points, which was the club's record at the time. This was followed by shock losses to the Sydney City Roosters and Cronulla, but Langer led them to a big win over Canterbury only to see two more club losses. But the Broncos recovered to post huge wins over Penrith and the Western Suburbs Magpies. The Broncos finished the remainder of the regular season undefeated finishing with 10 wins and 1 draw in their last 11 games. The top try-scorer from the NRL season was Brisbane's Darren Smith.

After a week off granted by winning the minor premiership, the Broncos were smothered out of the game by Parramatta 15-10 in their opening finals match. But they lifted and provided some miracle spark against the Melbourne Storm 30-6 a week later, resurrecting their premiership hopes. A huge win over Sydney City 46-18 in the preliminary final installed them at near unbackable odds against Canterbury in the first NRL Grand Final. The Broncos came back from a 12-10 half time deficit to again win consecutive premierships for the second time, and their fourth in seven seasons with a 38-12 Grand Final victory.

The Broncos were also named "Queensland Sport Team of the Year" at the Queensland Sport Awards.

Match results 

^Game following a State of Origin match

Brisbane Broncos NRL average home attendance in 1998: 20,073

Ladder

Grand final 

Brisbane Broncos vs. Canterbury Bulldogs

Brisbane 38 (TRIES: De Vere, Campion, Carroll, Sailor, Tallis, Lee, Smith; GOALS Lockyer 5/7)

defeated

Canterbury 12 (TRIES: Grimaldi, Talau; GOALS: Halligan 2/3)

Halftime: Canterbury 12-10

Referee: Bill Halligan

Stadium: Sydney Football Stadium

Crowd: 40, 857

Clive Churchill Medal: Gorden Tallis (Brisbane)

Scorers

Honours

League 
 Premiership
 Minor premiership

Club 
 Player of the year: Andrew Gee
 Rookie of the year: Petero Civoniceva
 Back of the year: Kevin Walters
 Forward of the year: Shane Webcke
 Club man of the year: Brett Green

References

External links 
 1998 - Broncos Take Inaugural NRL Competition - rl1908.com

Brisbane Broncos seasons
Brisbane Broncos season